Pedro Clar Rosselló (born 23 January 1986) is a Spanish tennis coach and former professional player.

Clar, born in Llucmajor, was at a time the second ranked Mallorcan player on tour behind Rafael Nadal. He reached a best world ranking of 237 in 2010, appearing in all four grand slam qualifying draws that year. During his career he won 11 ITF Futures singles titles.

A member of the Rafa Nadal Academy, Clar is on the coaching team of Norwegian player Casper Ruud and helped the Norwegian reach two grand slam finals in 2022.

ATP Challenger/ITF Futures finals

Singles: 20 (11–9)

Doubles: 19 (7–12)

References

External links
 
 

1986 births
Living people
Spanish male tennis players
Spanish tennis coaches
Sportspeople from Mallorca